The cantons of Tarbes are administrative divisions of the Hautes-Pyrénées department, in southwestern France. Since the French canton reorganisation which came into effect in March 2015, the city of Tarbes is subdivided into 3 cantons. Their seat is in Tarbes.

Cantons

References

Cantons of Hautes-Pyrénées